Clell D. Elwood (August 9, 1924 – March 25, 2018) was an American politician in the state of South Dakota. He was a member of the South Dakota House of Representatives and South Dakota Senate. He is an alumnus of the College of Idaho and was a businessman owning an insurance company, as well as an insurance agent.

References

1924 births
2018 deaths
Republican Party members of the South Dakota House of Representatives
People from Creighton, Nebraska